

Flower

Largest flowers

Individual flower

They grow in the forests of Sumatra and Borneo islands of Indonesia. With no roots, stems, leaves or chlorophyll, they are parasitic to many plants on the roots of their vine. This made Rafflesia very hard to place in scientific taxonomy compared to other plant species. DNA analyses have shown that they belong to the family Euphorbiaceae, which is usually characterized by minute flowers. The most famous plant species in this family are Spurges, Cassava, and rubber tree. The very existence of the plant can only become visible when its plump buds emerge from the host through the bark on parts of the host tree, out of the ground, when it ripens, and excretes a fleshy scent of corpse to attract pollinators, which are carrion-flies

Inflorescence

Branched inflorescence

Corypha umbraculifera

Unbranched inflorescence
Titan arum (Amorphophallus titanum), also known as the "corpse flower", is a flowering plant with the largest unbranched inflorescence in the world. The titan arum's inflorescence is not as large as that of the talipot palm, Corypha umbraculifera, but the inflorescence of the talipot palm is branched rather than unbranched. It is endemic to Sumatra, Java and Bali - Indonesia. The titan arum is characterized as a carrion flower, and is also known as the corpse flower or corpse plant (Indonesian: bunga bangkai – bunga means flower, while bangkai can be translated as corpse, cadaver, or carrion). For the same reason, the title corpse flower is also sometimes attributed to the genus Rafflesia.

Fruit

Heaviest & largest fruit
The current world record holder for heaviest fruit is a pumpkin that weighed 2703 pounds, which was grown by Stefano Cutrupi.

Smallest & lightest fruit
The fruit of species in the genus of Wolffia is the smallest and lightest fruit in the world. Two of the smallest species of Wolffia in the world, the Australian Wolffia angusta, and the Asian/African Wolffia globosa are so small that it is difficult to distinguish between the size of their fruits. The fruit of W. angusta is 0.30 mm long (1/100th of an inch) and weighs about 70 micrograms (1/400,000 of an ounce). Even though it is the smallest fruit in the world, it is one of the largest fruits relative to the size of the parent plant. Common size of the parent plant of the two example species of Wolffia is less than one millimetre in length (less than 1/25th of an inch). This means the small ripe fruit of the genus takes up a third or more of the length of the parent plant.

See also root
 List of superlative trees
 List of largest inflorescences
 List of world's largest seeds
 List of world's largest mushrooms and conks
 List of world's longest vines

References

Lists of plants
Lists of superlatives